Heishijiao Subdistrict is a township-level division of the Shahekou District of Dalian, Liaoning, China.

Administration
There are 9 communities within the subdistrict.

Communities:
Hongxingcun Community
Jianshan Community
Jingshan Community
Lingshui Community
Youjia Community
Shuxiangyuan Community
Zhenhua Community
Gongjian Community
Xi'nan Road Community

See also
List of township-level divisions of Liaoning
Shahekou

References

External links
黑石礁街道党建网 

Dalian
Township-level divisions of Liaoning
Subdistricts of the People's Republic of China